Peckville is a village in Lackawanna County, Pennsylvania, United States, roughly  northwest of Scranton. The governing borough of Peckville is Blakely.

See also
 Blakely, Pennsylvania

Unincorporated communities in Pennsylvania